Ari Gesini (born 23 December 2001) is an Australian Paralympic athlete in the T38 class. Ari competes in the long jump and 100m sprint. He made his Paralympic debut at the 2020 Summer Paralympics in Tokyo.

Personal 
Ari Gesini was born on 23 December 2001. He was diagnosed with left-sided hemiplegic cerebral palsy at age three. He lives in Canberra and attended Telopea Park School (Lycee Franco-Australian de Canberra) from 2007 to 2017. He also attended Narrabundah College from 2018 to 2019. Gesini is currently studying a Bachelor of Science in Psychology at the University of Canberra.

Athletics 
Gesini commenced participating in sport to assist his coordination and mobility. He is classified as a T38 athlete. His first athletics coach in Canberra was Chris Timpson. At the age of thirteen, Iryna Dvoskina invited Gesini to join her elite para-athletics squad based at the Australian Institute of Sport in Canberra.

Gesini won the gold medal in the Men's Long Jump T35-38 at the 2017 World Junior Championships in Nottwil, Switzerland. At the 2019 World Para Athletics Championships in Dubai, he finished fourth with a jump of 6.16 m, an Oceanic record, and 12th in the Men's 100m T38 with a PB of 12.05 seconds.

In 2022 Ari holds the T38 long jump Oceanic Record of 6.21m, which he jumped at the 2022 Oceania Athletics Championships in Mackay. 

At the 2020 Tokyo Paralympics, he finished seventh in his heat of the Men's 100m T38 and 11th in the Men's Long Jump T38.

In 2022, he is coached by Iryna Dvoskina and Sebastian Kuzminski at the Australian Institute of Sport in Canberra.

Recognition 
Gesini was awarded the Chief Minister's Sporting Award in 2011, 2012 and 2014.
In 2014/15, he was named Youth Para Athlete of the Season by Athletics ACT. 
In 2020, he was awarded a Tier 1 Scholarship within the Sport Australia Hall of Fame Scholarship & Mentoring Program and paired with SAHOF Member George Gregan.

References

External links 
 
 Sport Australia Hall of Fame Scholarship Profile
 Australian Athletics Historical Results

2001 births
Living people
Paralympic athletes of Australia
Athletes (track and field) at the 2020 Summer Paralympics
Track and field athletes with cerebral palsy
Cerebral Palsy category Paralympic competitors
Sportspeople from Canberra
Australian male sprinters
Australian male long jumpers